Robert Moritz is the vice president and editor-in-chief of Citysearch, a leading provider of local search services. Before joining Citysearch, he was an executive producer of HBO New Media’s Online Comedy Network where he oversaw original programming for the division. Moritz is the former West Coast editor of GQ magazine as well as West Coast editor for Men's Health and its sister publication, Best Life. He was also contributing editor at parade where he covered technology for the 40+ million circulation weekly.

He also has a music career with the punk band, Uke til u puke.

External links 
 Robert Moritz official web site
 Robert Moritz New York Magazine archives

Year of birth missing (living people)
Living people
Ukulele players
Place of birth missing (living people)